JRA is a three-letter abbreviation for:

 Japan Racing Association - horse-racing
 Japanese Red Army
 Jeff Reine-Adélaïde, French footballer
 Jewish Relief Agency
 Joint Replacement Aircraft
 Johannesburg Roads Agency, South African based road agency
 The Journal of Roman Archaeology
 Juvenile rheumatoid arthritis
 Juvenile Rehabilitation Administration
 Juvenile Restoration Act
 Jamtland Republican Army - the name of the independence movement of the Republic of Jamtland